Orthmann is a surname. Notable people with the surname include:

Ernst Gottlob Orthmann (1859–1922), German gynecologist
Hanna Orthmann (born 1998), German volleyball player
Hans-Jürgen Orthmann (born 1954), German former long-distance runner
Wilhelm Orthmann (1901–1945), German physicist
Winfried Orthmann (born 1935), German archaeologist specializing in Near East regions

See also
Ortmann